The Regents is a Barbershop quartet that won the 1974 SPEBSQSA international competition.  The quartet hailed from southeastern Pennsylvania.  One of the singers was Ron Knickerbocker, a high school science teacher at the Downingtown Senior High School.  The quartet won the championship after several years of being in the top five finalists.

References

External links
 AIC entry (archived)

Barbershop quartets
Barbershop Harmony Society